The City of Londonderry parliamentary constituency was a single member constituency in the Parliament of Northern Ireland. It was created in 1929, as one of the five single member constituencies replacing the former five member Londonderry constituency.

The constituency included the eastern part of the city of Derry and its environs including the Waterside district and Eglinton area.

The seat was held continuously by Ulster Unionist Party candidates, although it was often contested by other parties.

The constituency was last contested at the 1969 General Election. The Northern Ireland parliament was suspended in 1972 and abolished in 1973. In elections to various Northern Ireland assemblies and forums which sat from 1973 to 1986 the area formed part of a revived Londonderry constituency. Since the abolition of the 1982–1986 Northern Ireland assembly the area has formed part of the Foyle constituency.

Members of Parliament
1929 – 1939: Edward Sullivan Murphy, Ulster Unionist Party
1939 – 1947: William Lowry, Ulster Unionist Party
1947 – 1951: James Godfrey MacManaway, Ulster Unionist Party
1951 – 1968: Edward Warburton Jones, Ulster Unionist Party
1968 – 1972: Albert Anderson, Ulster Unionist Party

Source:

Election results

Source:

References

Constituencies of the Northern Ireland Parliament
Northern Ireland Parliament constituencies established in 1929
Northern Ireland Parliament constituencies disestablished in 1973
Politics of Derry (city)
Historic constituencies in County Londonderry